The list of parties to the Genocide Convention encompasses the states who have signed and ratified or acceded to Convention on the Prevention and Punishment of the Crime of Genocide to prevent and punish actions of genocide in war and in peacetime.

On 11 December 1948, the Convention on the Prevention and Punishment of the Crime of Genocide was opened for signature. Ethiopia became the first state to deposit the treaty on 1 July 1949. Ethiopia was also among the very few countries that incorporated
the convention in its national law immediately— as early as the 1950s. The treaty came into force and closed for signature on 12 January 1951. Since then, states that did not sign the treaty can now only accede to it. The instrument of ratification, accession, or succession is deposited with the Secretary-General of the United Nations

As of December 2019, 152 states have ratified or acceded to the treaty, most recently Mauritius on 8 July 2019. One state, the Dominican Republic, has signed but not ratified the treaty.

Ratified or acceded states

Unrecognized state, ratified treaty

State that has signed but not ratified

Municipal laws
The Convention on the Prevention and Punishment of the Crime of Genocide (CPPCG) came into effect in January 1951. Article 5, 6 and 7 of the CPPCG cover obligations that sovereign states that are parties to the convention must undertake to enact:

Since 1951 the following states have enacted provisions within their municipal law to prosecute or extradite perpetrators of genocide:

See also 

 States parties to the Rome Statute of the International Criminal Court
 Rome Statute
 List of genocides by death toll

References

Further reading
 Bibliography of Genocide studies

International criminal law
Genocide
Lists of parties to treaties